April is in my mistress' face written by Thomas Morley is one of the best-known and shortest of English madrigals; it was published in 1594, and appears to be based on an Italian text by Livio Celiano set by Orazio Vecchi in 1587.

April is in my mistress' face, 
And July in her eyes hath place; 
Within her bosom is September, 
But in her heart a cold December.

References

External links 
 

English madrigals
16th-century songs
Compositions by Thomas Morley